The Virginia Constitutional Convention of 1850 was an assembly of elected delegates chosen by the voters to write the fundamental law of Virginia. It is known as the Reform Convention because it liberalized Virginia political institutions.

Background and composition

Following the 1830 Constitution, Virginia began to change politically under the pressure of party competition. The Old Republican gentry rule supported by their local county freeholders began to be replaced by partisan lawyers of state's rights Democrats and commercially minded Whigs, though the planter elite and their representatives in the ruling Democratic "Richmond Junto" continued to resist any change. Democrats were divided between easterners who supported an apportionment in the General Assembly based on a mixed basis of population and property which favored their slave-holding counties. Democrats in the west, while agreeing with anti-federal government Doctrines of '98 and states' rights, were more inclined to a white population basis. The Whigs were more united statewide in their insistence to expand suffrage and find a more equitable reapportionment between east and west sections.

The General Assembly malapportionment was a perpetual irritant in Virginia's politics, and in December 1849 Democrat John B. Floyd became the fourth governor to call for a Constitutional Convention to reform the Constitution of 1830. Although the Assembly complied, the planter Richmond Junto succeeded in extending the existing Assembly apportionment for the Convention representation. While the western counties held more than half of the white population, the eastern Piedmont and Tidewater sections held over sixty percent in the Virginia Senate.

Most states reformed their earlier Constitutions to embrace white manhood suffrage and white population apportionment in state legislatures. Instead of the earlier colonial "stake in society", they placed a democratic faith in the people's ability to govern themselves in a democracy. But only in Virginia did the reactionary basis remain a mixed basis of population and property to reflect the "majority of interest" in slaves. Indeed, even reformers in the "Reform Convention" of 1850 spent most of their time explaining that their innovations would not threaten the institution of slavery in Virginia. The Convention delegates were a younger generation raised in the Second American Party System of Democrat Jefferson Davis and Whig Henry Clay. Unlike the three generation Convention of 1829-30, they were primarily in their twenties and thirties at the beginning of their careers in the professions and industry, without large land holdings, without gentry family ties.

Meeting and debate
The Convention met from October 14, 1850 - August 1, 1851, and elected John Y. Mason its presiding officer.

The Convention featured fierce debates, the arguments raged throughout Virginia in the press and they were widely reported nationally. Direct popular election of governor was supported by Whig Congressman John Minor Botts. He was opposed by Richmond Junta Democrat Richard L.T. Beale who argued against the natural equality of all men, and the "plundering propensities" of the multitude seeking a "majority of mere numbers". Although for direct election of Governor, Henry A. Wise was more fearful of the eastern slave-holders loss of control in the General Assembly. He believed that "protection of slavery, not the liberalizing of Virginia's Constitution, was the most significant business before the convention." Albert G. Pendleton suggested that nearly 100,000 citizens of the western counties were disenfranchised by the 1830 Constitution, and that malapportionment led to the lack of internal improvements needed in west. Muscoe R.H. Garnett opposed expanding the franchise to prohibit internal improvements that might benefit the western counties. James Barbour objected to extending the franchise to white westerners because support for outright emancipation had originated from there in the past. Even with proposals for freed slave expatriation to Africa, Barbour doubted any assurances from the west for the long run preservation of slavery.

After almost six months of wrangling, the question of apportionment was brought up for a vote. The plan for representation in both houses on a mixed basis failed, and the plan for representation in both houses on a population basis failed. The compromise was for the House of Delegates to be on the white population basis, giving the western counties a majority, and for the Senate to be on a modified mixed basis of population and property including slaves, giving the eastern counties a majority. In the remaining two months of the Convention, it was agreed to allow direct popular election of the governor, but each office holder would be limited to one term. Constitutional provision for public education was voted down.  Voting by secret ballot was rejected, perpetuating the voting vive voce aloud.

Outcomes

The powerful Assembly-appointed Governor's Council was abolished and a popular elected Lieutenant Governor was created. Most radically, judges on the Supreme Court of Appeals, in district courts, and county justices of the peace were to be elected by the expanded electorate. Three classes of taxation were linked so that an increase in one required the same increase on all, applicable to poll tax on whites, land taxes and slave taxes. In a measure to advantage slave owners, taxes were set for adult slaves at $300 each when the unskilled field hand was valued twice as much in Virginia. The state legislature lost its statutory ability to manumit slaves, and it was enabled to pass legislation prohibiting individual owner manumissions of their slaves.

Over three days' balloting in October 1851, the new Constitution was overwhelmingly approved by 75,748 for with 11,060 against. Property requirements for voting were abolished and Virginia state government had the democratic form of Jacksonian America at last. Yet the Richmond Junto leadership of state's rights Democratic rule remained nearly as powerful as ever.

Chart of Delegates
The delegates to the Virginia Convention of 1850-1851 – elected on the fourth Thursday in August, 1850.
(One hundred and thirty-five members, from each Delegate District

See also
Virginia Conventions

References

Bibliography

External links
Register of the Debates and Proceedings of the Virginia Reform Convention of 1850 William G. Bishop, official reporter, Richmond Republican Extras. 1851, from the Duke University Libraries at archive.org

1850 in Virginia
1851 in Virginia
American constitutional conventions
Political history of Virginia
1850 in American politics
1850 in the United States
1851 in American politics
1851 in the United States